Aghil Kaabi (born July 29, 1990) is an Iranian professional football defender who currently plays for Iranian football club Naft Masjed Soleyman in the Persian Gulf Pro League.

Iran

Club career
Kaabi joined to Foolad Novin in summer 2013 from Naft Masjed Soleyman F.C. He was part of Foolad Novin in promoting to Division 1 in 2014 and to Pro League in 2015. He joined to Esteghlal Khuzestan in summer 2015 with a contract until 2018. he made his professional debut for Esteghlal Khuzestan on August 14, 2015 in Ahvaz Derby against Foolad as a starter.

Club career statistics

Honours

Club
Foolad Novin
 Azadegan League (1): 2014–15

Esteghlal Khuzestan
Iran Pro League (1): 2015–16
Iranian Super Cup runner-up: 2016

References

External links
 Aghil Kaabi at IranLeague.ir
 Aghil Kaabi at Foolad FC
 
 
 Aghil kaabi at Fotmob.com
 Aghil kaabi at PersianLeague.com 
 
 Aghil Kaabi at Footballi.net 
 
 Aghil Kaabi at Metafootball.com
 

1990 births
Living people
Iranian footballers
Naft Masjed Soleyman F.C. players
Esteghlal Khuzestan players
Sanat Naft Abadan F.C. players
People from Ahvaz
Association football defenders
Mes Rafsanjan players
Sportspeople from Khuzestan province